Pogonești is a commune in Vaslui County, Western Moldavia, Romania. It is composed of three villages: Belcești, Pogonești and Polocin. These were part of Ivești Commune until 2004, when they were split off.

References

Communes in Vaslui County
Localities in Western Moldavia